William Merritt (died 1708) was the 22nd Mayor of New York City. He served from 1695 to 1698.

Notes

Year of birth missing
1708 deaths
Mayors of New York City